The following is a chronological overview of the history of the Tamil people, who trace their ancestry to the Indian state of Tamil Nadu, the Indian Union territory of Puducherry, or the Northern, Eastern Province and Puttalam District of Sri Lanka.

Pre-Sangam period

Sangam age

Post-Sangam period

Pallava and Pandya

Chola period

Chola to Pandya transition

Pandiya revival and Muslim rule

Vijayanagar and Nayak period

East India Company

British rule

Post independence period

See also
 History of Tamil Nadu
 Tamil culture
 Tamil diaspora

References

 Nilakanta Sastri, K.A. A History of South India, OUP, Reprinted 2000
 Nilakanta Sastri, K.A., Srinivasachari, Advanced History of India, Allied Publishers Ltd, New Delhi, Reprinted 2000
 Read, Anthony, The Proudest Day - India's Long Ride to Independence, Jonathan Cape, London, 1997

External links
Tamil Sentiment. Tamil shrines, Tamil culture, the history of Tamils, by Kavi Yogi Dr. Shuddhananda Bharati
 Historical Atlas of South India-Timeline-http://www.ifpindia.org/Historical-Atlas-of-South-India-Timeline.html (French Institute of Pondicherry)
 Codrington, Humphry William,   A Short History of Lanka  <http://lakdiva.org>
 Veluppillai, Prof. A., Religious Traditions of the Tamils  http://tamilelibrary.org/

Tamil history
History of Tamil Nadu
Tamil history
Indian history timelines
Tamil Nadu-related lists
Timelines of Indian states